Ochrota malagassa is a moth of the subfamily Arctiinae. It was described by Strand in 1912. It is found in Madagascar.

References

Lithosiini
Moths described in 1912